Nauris Sējējs (born 15 March 2001) is a Latvian professional ice hockey defenceman who is currently playing with HC La Chaux-de-Fonds of the Swiss League (SL) as a prospect to Genève-Servette HC of the National League (NL).

Sējējs played his junior hockey in Switzerland which allows him to compete in the NL and the SL with a Swiss player-license.

Playing career
On April 6, 2021, Sējējs was signed by Genève-Servette HC to his first professional contract, agreeing to a one-year deal.

On May 5, 2021, it was announced that Sējējs would be loaned to HC La Chaux-de-Fonds of the Swiss League (SL) for the 2021/22 season.

Personal life
His twin brother, Nils Sējējs, also plays professional hockey with Genève-Servette HC as a winger. They were born in the Czech Republic where their father Normunds was playing hockey at the time, though the family returned to Latvia within a few years.

Both twins left Latvia and moved to Geneva in 2016 at age 15 to continue their junior careers.

Career statistics

Regular season and playoffs

International

References

External links

2001 births
Living people
Genève-Servette HC players
HC La Chaux-de-Fonds players
Latvian ice hockey defencemen
Ice hockey players at the 2022 Winter Olympics
Olympic ice hockey players of Latvia
Twin sportspeople
Latvian twins
Ice hockey people from Riga
Sportspeople from Karlovy Vary
Latvian expatriate sportspeople in Switzerland
Latvian expatriate ice hockey people
Expatriate ice hockey players in Switzerland